The 2015 Mid-Eastern Athletic Conference (MEAC) softball tournament was held at Ormond Beach Sports Complex in Ormond Beach, Florida, from May 7 through May 9, 2015. The tournament winner will earn the MEAC's automatic bid to the 2015 NCAA Division I softball tournament. Stats will be available for all games, but no games will be streamed or televised.

Tournament

All times listed are Eastern Daylight Time.

References

Tournament
Mid-Eastern Athletic Conference softball tournament
MEAC softball tournament